Sumvitg-Cumpadials railway station is a railway station in the municipality of Sumvitg, in the Swiss canton of Graubünden. It is an intermediate stop on the  gauge Reichenau-Tamins–Disentis/Mustér line of the Rhaetian Railway.

Services
The following services stop at Sumvitg-Cumpadials:

During the summer months Sumvitg Turissem operates a weekend-only minibus to the Val Sumvitg.

Facilities
There is a small waiting room at this station. There was a toilet, but this has recently been permanently locked. There is also a ticket machine. There is also a bike storage rack and ample parking.

References

External links 
 
 

Railway stations in Graubünden
Rhaetian Railway stations
Sumvitg
Railway stations in Switzerland opened in 1912